Binge (stylized as Binge.) was an Australian 24-hour pay television channel available on the Foxtel platform. Originally scheduled to launch on 1 October 2016, the channel instead launched on 5 October 2016. The channel, similar to sister channel BoxSets, broadcast multiple episodes of drama and comedy programs, allowing viewers to binge-watch a series. Binge was part of the drama pack on channel 119.

The channel was closed on 7 November 2019, then it was replaced by Fox One.

History
The channel was announced on 1 August 2016 as a replacement for SoHo, which would be closed at the same time. Existing programs on SoHo would be migrated to other Foxtel channels, including showcase, TV H!TS, Arena and FOX8.

The first program to air was the entire first season of Supergirl.

On 7 November 2019, the channel ceased operations, after which the channel space created in 1995 by FX ceased to exist.

It was revealed on 23 May 2020 that Foxtel had repurposed the brand for a brand new streaming service named BINGE, which would act as a direct competitor to streaming video-on-demand services like Netflix and Stan.

Programming
Programming on Binge was aimed at the 18-49 and 25-54 demographic groups.

Availability
The channel was only available through the Foxtel platform on channel 119 (originally channel 116).

References

Television networks in Australia
Defunct television channels in Australia
Television channels and stations established in 2016
Television channels and stations disestablished in 2019
2016 establishments in Australia
2019 disestablishments in Australia
Foxtel
English-language television stations in Australia